Vidit Santosh Gujrathi (born 24 October 1994) is an Indian chess grandmaster. He attained the title of grandmaster in January 2013, becoming the 30th player from India to do so.  he is the second highest rated player in India (behind Viswanathan Anand). He is the fourth Indian player to have crossed the Elo rating threshold of 2700.

Early life and chess career 
Vidit Santosh Gujrathi was born in Nashik to Santosh Gujrathi and Nikita Santosh Gujrathi. He did his early schooling at Fravashi Academy and was coached in chess from an early age. In 2006, he finished second in the Asian Youth Championships in the U12 category, thus receiving the title of FIDE Master.

Vidit achieved the title of International Master(14) when he secured 7 points out of 13 in the Velammal 45th National A Chess Championship in Chennai in 2008. In 2008, he won the World Youth Chess Championship in the Open U14 section, the first Indian to do so. He scored 9 points out of a possible 11, gaining his final norm to become an International Master.

He finished 2nd in the U16 category of the World Youth Chess Championship in 2009, tying at 9 points to the eventual winner S. P. Sethuraman, also from India. In the World Junior Chess Championship in Chennai in 2011, held for U20 players, Vidit finished with 8 points out of 11, thus gaining his first GM norm.

In the Nagpur International Open in 2011, Vidit finished with 8 points out of 11, one point behind the eventual winner Ziaur Rahman. He gained his second GM norm in the tournament. Vidit achieved his final GM norm at the age of 18 in the eighth round of the Rose Valley Kolkata Open Grandmasters' chess tournament in 2012, where he finished third.

In 2013, Vidit won a bronze medal in the World Junior Chess Championship in Turkey in the Junior (U20) category. Vidit finished third in the Hyderabad International Grandmasters chess tournament in 2013, winning Rs 1.5 lakh.

Vidit has been also performing in the top 10 of other tournaments, including the Commonwealth Championship in 2008. Throughout the years, Vidit was coached by IM Anup Deshmukh, IM Roktim Bandopadhyay, and GM Alon Greenfeld of Israel. Grandmaster Abhijit Kunte, who also coached Vidit earlier, said in 2013 that Vidit could reach an Elo rating of 2700 in two to three years. Kunte also considered Vidit's positional sense excellent, comparing him to the Indian chess player Pentala Harikrishna.

From 2226 November 2019, he competed in the Tata Steel Rapid and Blitz as a wildcard competitor. He finished in a tie for eighth with fellow wildcard Pentala Harikrishna. He was a part of the Skilling Open, the first event of the 2020–2021 online Champions Chess Tour.

He was the captain of the historic gold medal-winning Indian team in FIDE Online Chess Olympiad 2020.

Through February and March 2022, Vidit played in the FIDE Grand Prix 2022. In the first leg, he tied for second with Daniil Dubov with 3/6 in Pool C. In the second leg, he finished second in Pool C with a result of 3/6, finishing 12th in the standings with seven points.

Notable results
 Captain of gold medal-winning Indian team in FIDE Online Chess Olympiad 2020.
 First place in 2019 Biel Chess Festival Grandmaster tournament.
 Runner-up at the 2020 Prague Chess Festival masters tournament.
 Quarter-finalist of FIDE World Fischer Random Chess Championship 2019.
 Rank #12 out of 154 in the FIDE Grand Swiss Tournament 2019 with a score of 7/11.
 Quarter-finalist of FIDE World Cup 2021.

References

External links
 
 
 
 

1994 births
Living people
Chess grandmasters
Indian chess players
People from Nashik